The Leabhar Branach, also called the (Poem) Book of the O'Byrnes is an Early Modern Irish anthology of poetry collected in the early 17th century. It consists of poetry in praise of the O'Byrne family, who ruled a region known as Gabhal Raghnaill in modern County Wicklow. The poems were written between roughly 1550 and 1630, a time of turmoil in Ireland that saw the Desmond Rebellions, Nine Years' War and O'Doherty's rebellion.

According to scholar Seán Mac Airt, who published a print version in 1944, "the Leabhar Branach, apart from its linguistic value, is important in that it affords us some insight from an Irish standpoint into the life and fortunes of a sept bordering the Pale, during an interesting if unhappy era of our history."

Contents
The poems were mostly written by poets of the McKeogh (Mac Eochaidh, Mac Eochadha) family. Some are also by Eochaidh Ó hÉoghusa.

Several poems are dedicated to Fiach McHugh O'Byrne (1534–1597). His wife Rose O'Toole is described in one poem as "a blazing meteor, wine of grape, flower of women... She glows with the fire of youth. She is the life and death of heroes."

Manuscripts

The original manuscript is lost. A copy was made by in 1622 by Brian Mac Giolla Phádraig. It is thanks to him that the poems survive as his copy was in turn copied by Hugh O'Daly; this manuscript is in Trinity College, Dublin, while a copy made by Michael O'Byrne in the 1720s is in Houghton Library, Harvard University.

References

Irish manuscripts
Irish texts
Irish-language literature
17th-century Irish literature
Irish poetry anthologies